Thomas M. Blackstock (January 12, 1834February 27, 1913) was a Scotch-Irish American immigrant, businessman, and Republican politician.  He was co-founder and president of the Phoenix Chair Company in Sheboygan, Wisconsin, and served four years as mayor of Sheboygan in the 1870s and 1880s.

Biography

Blackstock was born in County Armagh, in what is now Northern Ireland.  His father died when he was three years old.  He and his sisters were left in the care of family when his mother emigrated to the United States, they followed with their aunt several years later, in 1848.  They stopped briefly in Canada before arriving at Sheboygan, Wisconsin, in the Spring of 1849.

He was initially employed at a hotel, but soon went to work at Dr. J. J. Brown's drug store, where he remained until 1856.  From 1856 to 1861 he was employed as superintendent of the construction of the Sheboygan & Fond du Lac Plank Road.  He then purchased the drug business of Dr. Brown and operated the store for the next 15 years.

He was elected to the Wisconsin State Assembly from Sheboygan in 1868 on the Republican ticket.  He also served on the Sheboygan city council and was elected mayor in 1870, 1872, and 1883.

In 1875, he became involved in the organization of the Phoenix Chair Company and was named the first secretary of the company.  A year later, he was elected president and general manager of the company.  He maintained a controlling interest in the company for the rest of his life.

In 1885, he organized the Sheboygan Mutual Loan, Saving, and Building Association, and served as the president of that organization until his death in 1913.

Through his business success, he came to own substantial real estate in the city and formed the South Sheboygan Land Company to manage the property.

Blackstock has always been politically affiliated with the Republican Party.  He was elected as a delegate of Wisconsin to the 1892 Republican National Convention, and was prominently considered as a candidate for Governor of Wisconsin in 1894.

Personal life and legacy

In November 1861, Blackstock married Bridget Denn, of Waterford, Ireland. In 1882, the Blackstocks had an Italianate style home built for them on a small hilltop site in the Ellis Addition area of Sheboygan, which is now listed on U.S. National Register of Historic Places. Thomas and Bridget Blackstock were childless, but around 1890 adopted three of Bridget's brother's children, Mary, Nellie, and Annie, after the death of their mother.

Blackstock is credited with the establishment of the Civil War soldiers' monument at the southeast corner of Sheboygan's Fountain Park.

References

People from County Armagh
Businesspeople from Wisconsin
Wisconsin city council members
Mayors of Sheboygan, Wisconsin
Republican Party members of the Wisconsin State Assembly
1834 births
1913 deaths
19th-century American politicians
Irish emigrants to the United States (before 1923)
Irish emigrants to pre-Confederation Canada
19th-century American businesspeople